Predosa is a comune (municipality) in the Province of Alessandria in the Italian region Piedmont, located about  southeast of Turin and about  south of Alessandria.

Predosa borders the following municipalities: Basaluzzo, Bosco Marengo, Capriata d'Orba, Carpeneto, Casal Cermelli, Castellazzo Bormida, Castelspina, Fresonara, Rocca Grimalda, and Sezzadio.

References

Cities and towns in Piedmont